Spy aircraft may refer to:

Reconnaissance aircraft, using images for later analysis.
Surveillance aircraft, capturing real-time aerial observation.